Incorporated in 1943 in the State of California, the San Diego State University (SDSU) Research Foundation is a self-financed 501(c)(3) nonprofit corporation. It is a non-profit, auxiliary organization within the California State University (CSU) system, authorized by the Education Code of the State of California.  The SDSU Research Foundation is chartered to provide and augment programs that are an integral part of the educational mission of San Diego State University (SDSU). With annual revenues approaching $200 million and over 5,800 staff, contract and grant employees, it is the largest auxiliary within the CSU system.

Mission
The purpose of SDSU Research Foundation is to further the educational, research and community service mission of SDSU.

Management
The SDSU Research Foundation is governed by a Board of Directors whose principal function is to establish policies and guide the corporation in achieving its objectives. The Chief Executive Officer of SDSU Research Foundation is responsible to the Board of Directors for the management of the organization, serving as liaison between the Board and a staff that implements and carries out all Board policies and procedures.

References

External links
SDSU Research Foundation homepage

Research Foundation
California State University auxiliary organizations